Sara Jane Ho is a Chinese educator and founder of Institute Sarita, a Beijing finishing school opened in 2013, expanded with a Shanghai location in 2015. She is the etiquette expert for the 2022 Netflix series Mind Your Manners.

Education
A native of Hong Kong, Ho attended the Peak School and German Swiss International School, followed by Phillips Exeter Academy in New Hampshire. She studied English literature at Georgetown University, where she currently sits on the College Board, and holds an MBA from Harvard Business School.

Career
Ho initially started her career as a mergers & acquisitions analyst at the New York Investment Banks, Perella Weinberg Partners. After graduating from Institut Villa Pierrefeu, a Swiss finishing school, Ho moved to Beijing in 2013 to establish Institute Sarita. In May 2015, Ho opened a second school in Shanghai.

In 2013, Ho was included on the Forbes 2013 list of "Future Women in the Mix in Asia: 12 to Watch" and in 2015 was included as "Forbes 30 Under 30" and BBC 100 Women. Ho is also a Global Shaper for the World Economic Forum. Institute Sarita was recognized as one of the "World's Most Innovative 50 Companies" by Fast Company magazine in 2014.

References

Living people
Chinese educators
Chinese businesspeople
Phillips Exeter Academy alumni
Georgetown College (Georgetown University) alumni
Harvard Business School alumni
BBC 100 Women
21st-century Chinese women
21st-century Chinese people
21st-century women educators
Year of birth missing (living people)